Sitara Ayaz is a Pakistani politician and a member of Senate of Pakistan, representing Awami National Party.

Education
She has done BA from Jinnah College For Women in 1990.

Political career
She was elected to the Senate of Pakistan as a candidate of Awami National Party on reserved seat for women in 2015 Pakistani Senate election.
Native Town: District SWABI, Khyber Pakhtunkhwa
Positions held:	worked as Consultant (Development Sector)
Head of APWA (KPK) from 2003 to 2008
Provincial Minister of KPK for Social Welfare and Women Empowerment 2008-2013
Chairperson of the Senate Standing Committee on Climate Change.

References

Living people
Pakistani senators (14th Parliament)
Year of birth missing (living people)